Nilamel is a locality located in Kollam District of Kerala, India. It lies on the M C Road Thiruvananthapuram-Angamali state highway-1) and is 45 km from Thiruvananthapuram, 24 km away from Kottarakara and 5 km away from Kadakkal.

Geography
District: Kollam
Area    : 22 km
Population: 14,208
Literacy : 89.5%

References

External links
 Official Website

Cities and towns in Kollam district